Doty is a surname, meaning is unknown, as the surname origin is still a genealogical mystery.

Al Doty (born 1945), Minnesota politician
Charles Doty (1824–1918), Wisconsin pioneer, surveyor, military officer, and state legislator
Charles R. Doty (1924–2003), U.S. presidential write-in candidate
Chris Doty (1966–2006), Canadian filmmaker
David B. Doty (born 1950), American composer
Edward Doty (1599–1655), indentured servant on the Mayflower
Gary Doty (born 1948), American politician
James Duane Doty (1799–1865), American politician
Kathryn Adams Doty (1920–2016), American actress
Mark Doty (born 1953), American poet
Paul M. Doty (1920–2011), American scientist
Phoebe Doty (died 1849), 19th century prostitute
Ralph Doty (1941–2020), American politician
Richard Doty, American scientist
Roy Doty (1922–2015), American cartoonist
Sile Doty (1800–1876), 19th century outlaw
Thomas Doty (1928–1962), detonated dynamite on board an airplane for insurance money
Wayne C. Doty (born 1973), American murderer
William G. Doty (1852–1919), Michigan lawyer and politician

See also
Doty (disambiguation)